The Dog Bark Park Inn is a hotel located along Highway 95 in Cottonwood, Idaho. The hotel is built in the shape of a beagle, making it a famous landmark in the state. It is colloquially known as "Sweet Willy" by local residents. The hotel, which is located in north central Idaho, is a two-bedroom bed and breakfast which also features dog-themed contents.

History
Designed and building by Dennis Sullivan & Frances Conklin as the World's Biggest Beagle the bed and breakfast inn opened in August 2003.

Facilities
Dog Bark Park consists of the bed & breakfast inn, a gift shop & visitors center, and the gallery of chainsaw artists Dennis Sullivan & Frances Conklin.  Many breeds of dog carvings are prominently featured.

References

External links

Bed and breakfasts in Idaho